The Elmhurst Avenue station is a local station on the IND Queens Boulevard Line of the New York City Subway. Located at the intersection of Elmhurst Avenue, 45th Avenue, and Broadway in Elmhurst, Queens, it is served by the M train on weekdays, the R train at all times except nights, and the E and F trains at night.

History

Construction and opening

The Queens Boulevard Line was one of the first built by the city-owned Independent Subway System (IND), and was planned to stretch between the IND Eighth Avenue Line in Manhattan and 178th Street and Hillside Avenue in Jamaica, Queens, with a stop at Elmhurst Avenue. The line was first proposed in 1925. Construction of the line was approved by the New York City Board of Estimate on October 4, 1928. The line was constructed using the cut-and-cover tunneling method, and to allow pedestrians to cross, temporary bridges were built over the trenches.

The first section of the line opened on August 19, 1933 from the connection to the Eighth Avenue Line at 50th Street to Roosevelt Avenue in Jackson Heights. Later that year, a $23 million loan was approved to finance the remainder of the line, along with other IND lines. The remainder of the line was built by the Public Works Administration. In 1934 and 1935, construction of the extension to Jamaica was suspended for 15 months and was halted by strikes. Construction was further delayed due to a strike in 1935, instigated by electricians opposing wages paid by the General Railway Signal Company. The chief engineer of the Elmhurst Avenue station was Robert Ridgway and the design engineer was Aaron I. Raisman. 

In August 1936, tracks were installed all the way to 178th Street, and the stations to Union Turnpike were completed.

Later years 

The opening of the Elmhurst Avenue station resulted in the development of Elmhurst as a commercial and residential neighborhood. This station was listed on the National Register of Historic Places on July 6, 2005, as structure number 05000672.

Station layout 

This underground station has four tracks and two side platforms. The two center express tracks are used by the E and F trains at all times except late nights.

Both platform walls have a Cerulean blue trim line on a black border with small "ELMHURST" tile captions in white lettering on a black background beneath them. They also have mosaic name tablets reading "ELMHURST AVE." in white sans-serif lettering on a black background and Cerulean blue border. The tile color was part of a color-coded tile system for the entire Independent Subway System. There are also advertising recesses between the tablets, as well as grates at the top of the platform wall.  The ceiling of the platform level is held up by yellow I-beam piers located every , which support girders underneath the mezzanine that runs above the platform level. The roof girders are also connected to columns in the platform walls.

The tunnel is covered by a "U"-shaped trough that contains utility pipes and wires. The outer walls of this trough are composed of columns, spaced approximately every  with concrete infill between them. There is a  gap between the tunnel wall and the platform wall, which is made of -thick brick covered over by a tiled finish. The columns between the tracks are also spaced every , with no infill. 

This station has a full-length mezzanine above the platforms and tracks supported by yellow I-beam columns located every . It is separated into three sections by two chain-link fences, which separate the paid areas along the outer walls from the unpaid area in the center of the station. However, underneath the westernmost staircase of the station, there is a passageway that connects the mezzanines from each direction, allowing free transfers between directions. The token booth is at the center in the middle section outside fare control with a small turnstile bank to either outer section. Each platform has seven staircases going up to the mezzanine.

Exits

There are five entrances to the station in total, two on the northwestern end of the mezzanine and three on the southeastern end.

The staircases to the street are at either end of the mezzanine. On the northwest (railroad south) side, one staircase goes up to the southwest corner of 82nd Street and Broadway while another goes up to the southwest corner of Britton Avenue and Broadway. At this end, there are two exit-only turnstiles from the Forest Hills-bound side of the mezzanine and two High Entry-Exit Turnstiles from the Manhattan-bound side.

On the southeast (railroad north) side of the mezzanine, there are two staircases going up to either southern corner of 45th Avenue and Broadway. Another goes up to the northwest corner of Elmhurst Avenue and Broadway, which is built within a store front and goes through a small underground shopping arcade. On this side, there are two exit-only turnstiles and one High Entry-Exit Turnstile from the Forest Hills-bound side and two High Entry-Exit Turnstiles from the Manhattan-bound side.

Nearby infrastructure
The Elmhurst station on the Long Island Rail Road's Port Washington Branch was about one block to the south of this station before it closed in 1985.

Between this station and Jackson Heights–Roosevelt Avenue, there are holes on the tunnel's ceiling, which accommodate the never-used tunnels coming from the Roosevelt Avenue station's unused upper-level terminal.

References

External links 

 
 Station Reporter — R Train
 Station Reporter — M Train
 The Subway Nut — Elmhurst Avenue Pictures
 Elmhurst Avenue entrance from Google Maps Street View
 Britton Avenue entrance from Google Maps Street View
 82nd Street entrance from Google Maps Street View
 Platforms from Google Maps Street View

IND Queens Boulevard Line stations
Railway and subway stations on the National Register of Historic Places in New York City
New York City Subway stations in Queens, New York
Railway stations in the United States opened in 1936
Elmhurst, Queens
1936 establishments in New York City
National Register of Historic Places in Queens, New York